Phaeodactylibacter is a genus from the family Lewinellaceae.

References

Further reading 
 
 
 

Bacteroidota
Bacteria genera